The De La Rosa Elevated Walkway is a network of elevated pedway in Makati, Metro Manila, Philippines. Measuring , the structure is the longest elevated pedway in the Philippines. It runs mostly along De La Rosa Street in Legazpi Village of Makati Central Business District from Greenbelt at Ayala Center to Salcedo Street. It physically links buildings such as the Ayala North Exchange, Makati Medical Center, Eton Tower Makati, De La Rosa Car Park 1 & 2, The Enterprise Center Tower, and Greenbelt.

The pedway's construction began in early 1990s.

References

Pedestrian infrastructure in the Philippines
Skyways
Buildings and structures in Makati
Transportation in Metro Manila
Makati Central Business District